The Singer Takes It All is a British talent game show hosted by comedian Alan Carr, airing on Channel 4. The show premiered on 1 August 2014.

Format
Contestants perform on a moving stage (18m in length) which will be manipulated by viewers who can vote up to four times during each performance on a special app. The acts who impress the audience will move towards a 'Gold Zone' where contestants will compete for a cash prize. If, however, they fail to impress, they will be sent to the back of the stage and out of the show.

The viewers will be able to choose 'Hit' or 'Miss' depending on whether they like a contestant's performance on The Singer Takes It All mobile app.

The contestant who stays in the Gold Zone for the longest amount of time will go through to the final where they can win up to £15,000, the commentator of the show (only seen as a giant pair of lips) is former The X Factor contestant Brenda Edwards.

The show ended up being dominated by a singer named Steve Dorsett who appeared on 3 of the 4 shows, winning all 3 and netting himself a total of £42,600.

App
The Singer Takes It All official free mobile app was released in July 2014.

On 31 July 2014, a day before the first live show, Channel 4 revealed that over 1 million votes had been cast via the official app. Since its launch, the app had been downloaded around 35,000 times.

Celebrity guests and ratings
Official episode viewing figures are from BARB.

References

External links
.
.
.
.
Official Instagram.

2014 British television series debuts
2014 British television series endings
2010s British music television series
2010s British reality television series
2010s British game shows
English-language television shows
Channel 4 game shows
Television series by Banijay
Television shows shot at Elstree Film Studios
Television shows set in Hertfordshire